Hanzer Frères, Hanzer, was a French manufacturer of automobiles. The Petit-Ivry company of Ivry-sur-Seine began building automobiles in 1899. Production ended in 1903.

Vehicles

1899
In 1899 the first model produced was a tricycle.

1900
In 1900 they introduced a voiturette powered by a 3 Hp De Dion-Bouton engine.

1901
In 1901 both two and four-seater models were produced with 6 Hp engines from the Parisian builder Ateliers de Construction Mecanique l'Aster (Aster).

1902
In 1902 the Parisian Durey-Sohy (:de: Durey-Sohy) company took over production. A 1902 vehicle survives in the Bentley Wildfowl and Motor Museum at Halland, East Sussex. It is occasionally used in the London to Brighton Veteran Car Run.

1903
In 1903 the range consisted of the 5 HP and 6 HP single-cylinder models and the 9 HP two-cylinder model.

Literature 
 Harald H. Linz, Halwart Schrader : The International Automobile Encyclopedia . United Soft Media Verlag, Munich 2008, ISBN 978-3-8032-9876-8 .

 George Nick Georgano (Editor): The Beaulieu Encyclopedia of the Automobile. Volume 2: GO. Fitzroy Dearborn Publishers, Chicago 2001, ISBN 1-57958-293-1 . (English)

 George Nick Georgano: The Complete Encyclopedia of Motorcars. 1885 to the Present. Ebury, 1975.

References

Defunct motor vehicle manufacturers of France
French companies established in 1899
French companies disestablished in 1903